is a Japanese writer. He has won the Noma Literary New Face Prize, the Akutagawa Prize, and the Tanizaki Prize.

Biography
Hosaka was born in Yamanashi prefecture and received his undergraduate education at Waseda University with a major in political science and economics. After graduating he worked for Seibu Culture Centers, holding popular educational workshops on philosophy. During this period (1990) he published his first book, Plainsong. He left Seibu in 1993 to devote his efforts to writing full-time, with the assistance of fellow writer Nobuo Kojima.

Hosaka writes about ordinary people in ordinary life situations. His work has been compared with the movies of noted director Yasujirō Ozu. A common theme in his writing is the presence of a cat in the lives of his characters.

Recognition
1993 15th Noma Literary New Face Prize for Kusa no ue no choshoku (“Breakfast on the Grasses”)
1995 113th Akutagawa Prize (1995上) for Kono hito no iki (“The Area of the Person”)
1997 33rd Tanizaki Prize for Kisetsu no kioku  (Memories of Seasons)

References

External links
Official home page 
Synopsis of Plainsong at JLPP (Japanese Literature Publishing Project) 

Japanese writers
1956 births
Living people
People from Yamanashi Prefecture
Waseda University alumni
Akutagawa Prize winners